The 2016 Umaglesi Liga was a special transitional season of top-tier football in Georgia. Dinamo Tbilisi were the defending champions. This transitional season is a result of the Georgian Football Federation's decision to change the Umaglesi Liga season from an Autumn–Spring schedule to a Spring–Autumn one. The season began on 7 August 2016 and concluded with the second leg of the championship final on 11 December 2016.

Teams and stadiums

Sapovnela Terjola and Merani Martvili were relegated at the end of the previous season; they were not replaced. The league contracted from 16 teams to 14 this season; this will further be reduced to 10 for next season.

Source: Scoresway

Regular season

For this transitional season only, the 14 teams were divided into two groups of seven teams, Group Red and Group White. Each team played home-and-away against the other six teams within their own group only, resulting in 12 games each played (a decrease on the 30 games played in the previous season).

At the end of the regular season, the two group winners, Samtredia and Chikhura Sachkhere, met in the Championship final, this two-legged tie decided the overall champion and the berth for 2017–18 UEFA Champions League; the loser had the consolation of a berth in 2017–18 UEFA Europa League.

The four teams finishing in second and third in each group took part in the Bronze play-offs, the winning team clinched overall third place in the league (and bronze medals), and also a berth in 2017–18 UEFA Europa League.

The fifth and sixth-placed teams took part in relegation play-offs, the two losers joined the two bottom-placed teams in the 2017 Erovnuli Liga 2.

Group Red

Group White

Play-offs
The play-offs schedule was unveiled on 15 November 2016.

Bronze play-offs

Semi-finals

2–2 on aggregate. Dinamo Batumi won on away goals.

Dinamo Tbilisi won 1–0 on aggregate.

Final

Dinamo Batumi qualified for the 2017–18 Europa League first qualifying round.

Relegation play-offs

Dila Gori won 2–0 on aggregate and retained their place for 2017 Erovnuli Liga; Guria Lanchkhuti were relegated to 2017 Erovnuli Liga 2.

Shukura Kobuleti won 5–4 on aggregate and retained their place for 2017 Erovnuli Liga; Sioni Bolnisi were relegated to 2017 Erovnuli Liga 2

Championship final
A draw was made on 28 November 2016 to determine the order of the legs.

''Samtredia won 4–2 on aggregate and qualified for 2017–18 Champions League second qualifying round; Chikhura Sachkhere qualified for 2017–18 Europa League first qualifying round.

Top goalscorers

Source: soccerway.com

References

External links
  

Erovnuli Liga seasons
1
Georgia
Georgia